Winona may refer to places in the U.S. state of Tennessee:

Winona, Putnam County, Tennessee, an unincorporated community
Winona, Scott County, Tennessee, an unincorporated community